Tehachapi Municipal Airport  is in Tehachapi, Kern County, California.

The airport was established in 1929 originally to support an air mail route between Tehachapi and Bakersfield. After the 1952 Kern County earthquake Tehachapi became inaccessible by roads or rail, and the airport saw an emergency relief airlift for several weeks. There are hangars and an industrial park on the south side of the airport, and in 2009 the city was planning an expansion to include a taxiway and hangars on the north side.

In 1974 Golden West Airlines scheduled de Havilland Canada DHC-6 Twin Otters to Los Angeles (LAX). The flight is in the August 1974 OAG but not in the March 1975 edition.

Golden Age Flight Museum moved to temporary quarters in 2022.

See also 
 Mountain Valley Airport, privately owned gliderport also located in Tehachapi
 List of airports in Kern County, California

References

External links 
Tehachapi Composite Squadron 46, Civil Air Patrol
Flying into Tehachapi — by Frank Holbert.
Tehachapi Municipal Airport-related articles in the Tehachapi News:
"Tehachapi Airport becomes strong economic asset"
"New 'light sport' aircraft designed in Tehachapi"
"Tehachapi Airport is a Growing Force in our community"

Airports in Kern County, California
Municipal Airport
Airports established in 1929
1929 establishments in California